Mount Richardson is in northern Fiordland, in the Southland District of New Zealand, in the southwestern part of the country. The terrain around Mount Richardson is hilly to the northwest, and mountainous to the southeast.

The highest point in the area is Te Hau,  meters above sea level,  km south of Mount Richardson. Less than two people per square kilometer live around Mount Richardson. There is no town in the area. Mount Richardson is almost completely covered in forest. The hill is named after John Richardson, who was the third Superintendent of Otago Province.

The average rainfall  millimeters per year. The wettest month is October, with  millimeters of rain, and the wettest February, with  millimeters.

Viewfinder Panoramas, within a 10 kilometer radius. The full algorithm is available here.

References 

Richardson Mount
Southland District